The Decembrists is a 1927 Soviet silent historical drama film directed by Aleksandr Ivanovsky.

Plot
The film recreates the history of the movement of the Decembrists: an outbreak of peasant revolts, organization of nobility circles and the actual uprising; against the background of these events unfolds the romantic love story of the Decembrist Ivan Annenkov and French milliner Pauline Gueble.

Cast
 Vladimir Maksimov as Emperor Alexander I
 Yevgeni Boronikhin as Emperor Nicholas I
 Varvara Annenkova as Polina Gebl-Annenkova
 Boris Tamarin as Decembrist Ivan Alexandrovich Annenkov
 Tamara Godlevskaya - Countess Ekaterina Ivanovna Trubetskaya
 Gennadiy Michurin as Count Sergei Trubetskoy
 Sergei Shishko as Decembrist Kondraty Ryleyev
 Valentin Lebedev as Count Obolensky
 Ivan Khudoleyev as Yakoby, relative of the Annenkovys
 Olga Spirova as Natalia Rileeva

References

Bibliography 
 Christie, Ian & Taylor, Richard. The Film Factory: Russian and Soviet Cinema in Documents 1896-1939. Routledge, 2012.

External links 
 

1920s historical drama films
Soviet historical drama films
Soviet silent films
1920s Russian-language films
Films directed by Aleksandr Ivanovsky
Soviet black-and-white films
1927 drama films
1927 films
Cultural depictions of Nicholas I of Russia
Films set in the 19th century
Silent drama films